Sham'Rock & Roll is an album released by the rockabilly punk group Shillelagh Sisters. It was released in 2002.

In 2002 AlmaFame records released the album, made up of some of the band's demos, live performances and tracks from the Tyrannical Mex album. "Give Me My Freedom" and "Shout", from their CBS days, were also included in the album's demo recordings. The album also featured two demos from Max Attraction.

Track listing
 "Give Me My Freedom" (original demo version)
 "Shout" (original demo version)
 "Gotta Know"
 "When I see You Out" (live circa 83)
 "Hoy Hoy" (live circa 83)
 "Fool I Am"
 "Rockin' Lady"
 "Romp & Stomp"
 "Black Cadillac"
 "These Boots Are Made For Walkin'
 "Maximum Emotion" (performed by Max Attraction)
 "Whatcha Doin' Now?" (performed by Max Attraction)

Credits
Phil Bloomberg - producer (1, 2, 4, 5, 11, 12)
Shillelagh Sisters - producer (3, 6-10)

Release history

References

2002 albums
Shillelagh Sisters albums